The Good German is the soundtrack, released on the Varèse Sarabande label, of the 2006 Academy Award-nominated film The Good German. The original score was composed by Thomas Newman. The soundtrack was nominated for an Academy Award for Best Original Score.

Track listing
Below is a list of tracks:
"Unrecht Oder Recht (Main Title)" – 2:25
"River Havel" – 1:07
"Countless Roundheels" – 1:22
"Such a Boy"" – 1:36
"Kraut Brain Trust" – 1:05
"The Russian Deals" – 1:12
"A Good Dose" – 1:11
"Muller's Billet" – 0:48
"Wittenbergplatz" – 0:46
"Trip Ticket" – 1:41
"Safe House" – 0:57
"A Nazi and a Jew" – 1:51
"Dora" – 2:49
"Kurfürstendamm" – 0:44
"The Big Three" – 1:25
"A Persilschein" – 1:36
"Stickball" – 0:27
"Golem" – 1:10
"The Atom Bomb" – 1:31
"The Good German" – 2:10
"Hannelore" – 1:01
"Occupation Marks" – 1:19
"U-Bahn" – 1:37
"The Brandenburg Gate" – 1:26
"Skinny Lena" – 1:44
"Rockets for Our Side" – 1:50
"Always Something Worse" – 2:05
"Godless People (End Title)" – 2:43
"Jedem Das Seine" – 2:48

References

Thomas Newman albums
2006 soundtrack albums
Varèse Sarabande soundtracks